BOB FM is the on-air brand of a number of FM radio stations in the United States and formerly in Canada. The BOB FM format mostly concentrates on album rock, alternative rock and pop hits from the 1980s and 90s, especially those popular during the early days of MTV when music videos made up most of MTV's schedule.  But BOB FM also features a smattering of oldies from the 1970s or earlier and classic hits from the 1990s or later.  

Once or twice an hour, an unexpected song will get played, sometimes a dance hit or novelty song. BOB FM stations are quite similar to those using the moniker Jack FM. On many BOB FM and JACK FM stations, disc jockeys are not used or are only heard in morning drive time. Instead of a live DJ, a prerecorded voice will make sarcastic or ironic quips between songs.

BOB FM stations in Canada were all owned by Bell Media. Those in the United States are owned by a variety of companies. Bob FM stations are officially classified as variety hits or adult hits by radio research companies.

Origins 
It was originally named for the "Best of the Best", and subsequently associated with an everyday character named "Bob." It proved very successful in its first implementation on Winnipeg, Manitoba's CFWM. It inspired Rogers Communications to license the JACK FM format at many of its stations, Corus Entertainment's subsequent Joe FM and Dave FM brands, and comparable moves at other stations. Currently a syndicated version of the format is offered by Envision Radio Networks. As with Jack FM, Bob FM stations have playlists of over 1000 songs as opposed to most other commercial stations which play about 500 songs or less.

The format was largely conceived and created by Howard Kroeger, a former programming executive at CHUM Group Radio, after attending a friend's 40th birthday party in 2000. He took the "Bob" moniker from a country music station (then WBOB, today KFXN-FM) that had broadcast in the Minneapolis-St. Paul market of Minnesota to the south several years earlier.

Slogans 
Many BOB FM stations use the catch phrase "We Play Anything!" or "We Play Everything!"  Most stations market themselves with the slogan "Turn your knob to BOB!"  This was parodied in a Mystery Science Theater 3000 skit in which TV's Frank creates his own radio station and exhorts viewers to "Turn your crank to Frank", satirizing commercials for BOB 100 FM that were playing in the Minneapolis area at the time.

Many Bob-FM stations are imaged by Digital Sound & Video, Inc, located in Daytona Beach, Florida and voiced by Sean Caldwell.

Country Music 
At least two non variety-hits Bob FM outlets exist, WRBT in Harrisburg, Pennsylvania and KLCI in Minneapolis-St. Paul, both of which run a country music format. Kroeger created a similar format and brand for country stations, using Hank FM (named for Country and Western legend Hank Williams) and DUKE FM (named for actor John Wayne).  

HANK FM and DUKE FM can currently be heard in over twenty U.S. markets. The majority of these HANK FM and DUKE FM branded stations use the positioning statement of "Playing the Legends of Country" and are also distributed by Envision Radio Networks.

Stations Calling Themselves "BOB FM" 
CHUM Limited's CKLY in Kawartha Lakes, Ontario, adopted the format on August 21, 2005, while WLFF in Lafayette, Indiana, jettisoned its country format to introduce Bob to its listeners on December 6, 2007.

The newest Bob FM station in the United States is WCVS-FM in Springfield, Illinois, replacing its classic rock format.

The newest Bob FM station in Canada was CKX-FM in Brandon, Manitoba, replacing its mainstream rock format.

The first international (Non American or Canadian) Bob FM launched in early 2016 in George Town, Grand Cayman in The Cayman Islands. 94.9 BOB FM, Grand Cayman ZFBB-FM of Hurley's Media Ltd.

On March 18, 2021, the remaining Bob FM stations in Canada were re-branded as Bounce Radio.

Bob FM stations in Canada

Bob FM stations in the United States

The first BOB FM outside of The U.S. or Canada launched in early 2016, broadcasting from George Town, Grand Cayman in the Cayman Islands. '94.9 BOB FM Grand Cayman' - ZFBB FM ( http://www.BobFm.Ky ) .

See also
 BOB fm (Hertfordshire) - an independent station based in the United Kingdom
 Froggy (brand)
 KISS-FM (brand)
 Jack FM
 ESPN Radio

References

External links
 Official website
 Bob FM at Envision Networks

Radio formats
Franchised radio formats
Classic hits radio stations